Julio César de Andrade Moura, more commonly known as Julinho (born October 31, 1965 in Salvador, Bahia, Brazil) is a retired football striker from Brazil, who obtained the Peruvian nationality. He played in various teams in Brazil but became famous playing with Peruvian team Sporting Cristal.

Profile
Julinho first played professional football for Vitória Futebol Clube (ES), team which he is a fan of, in 1982. He has played for several teams in Brazil including Flamengo, Avaí, Treze Futebol Clube and Fortaleza Esporte Clube.

In 1991, he was offered a job to play for Defensor Lima, despite knowing nothing about the team or Peruvian football in general, he accepted the offer for the salary. After two successful seasons with Defensor Lima, he was brought to Sporting Cristal in 1993.

With Sporting Cristal, he won the Peruvian First Division in 1993, 1994, 1995, and 2002. He also finished 2nd place in the same competition with Cristal in 1997, 1998, 2000, and 2003. He was part of the Sporting Cristal team that were runner up to the 1997 Copa Libertadores. He has become an idol to Sporting Cristal fans in his 10 year career with Cristal.

De Andrade made 12 appearances for the Peru national football team from 1996 to 1997.

Statistics

Individual awards

References

External links 

 Official Web Site (Spanish)

1965 births
Living people
Sportspeople from Salvador, Bahia
Association football forwards
Brazilian emigrants to Peru
Naturalized citizens of Peru
Brazilian footballers
Peruvian footballers
Vitória Futebol Clube (ES) players
CR Flamengo footballers
Avaí FC players
Treze Futebol Clube players
Fortaleza Esporte Clube players
Sporting Cristal footballers
Peruvian Primera División players
Peru international footballers